The Funhouse Summer Carnival Tour was the fifth concert tour by American recording artist Pink, launched in support of her fifth studio album Funhouse (2008). The Funhouse Summer Carnival and the Funhouse Tour (2009) sold a combined total 3 million tickets, and brought the tour to a final gross of $150 million. With the tour, Pink became the only female artist to sell out stadium shows in 2010 and the first solo female act to open the Wireless Festival in London, UK. Tor Nielson of Live Nation Sweden gave a statement calling Pink "Sweden's biggest stadium act" of 2010. The tour grossed more than $46.4 million from 30 shows.

History
The tour was announced by tour promoter, Eventim, on October 14, 2009, followed by an announcement on Pink's official website in November. After selling over two million tickets on her successful Funhouse Tour, it was announced the Grammy Award-winning singer-songwriter will embark on her first ever stadium tour, in Europe. During an interview with online radio station, IN:DEMAND, Pink stated there will be a new setlist and less acrobatics, confirming that the tour isn't just a continuation of her previous tour.  The tour was set to begin on May 27, 2010 at the Expo-Gelände in Hanover, Germany, however, the show was canceled for logistical reasons. In December, it was also confirmed that Pink would headline music festivals throughout Europe during the tour.  Pink shot a new tour video for the tour in late April 2010. The video was shown while she was performing various songs. Butch Walker also duetted with Pink at most shows, including most festivals.

On July 15, 2010, during the show in Nürnberg, Germany, whilst performing "So What", Pink was not attached to her harness properly and fell, landing on the barricade. The song was immediately stopped, and the singer was rushed to the hospital. Later, she tweeted that she had neither broken bones nor serious injuries. The stunt was then temporarily removed from the show, until it returned on July 20, during the concert in Prague, Czech Republic, where Pink soared through the crowd in her harness successfully.

Set list
The following set list is obtained from the May 29, 2010, show in Cologne, Germany. It is not intended to represent all dates throughout the tour.

"Get the Party Started"
"Funhouse"
"Ave Mary A"
"Who Knew"
"Bad Influence"
"Just Like a Pill"
"Please Don't Leave Me"
"Sober"
"I'm Not Dead"
"Unwind"
"Mean" (performed with Butch Walker)
"My Generation" / "Basket Case" / "Roxanne" (performed with Butch Walker)
"Whataya Want from Me"
"Try Too Hard"
"U + Ur Hand"
"Leave Me Alone (I'm Lonely)"
Encore
"So What"

Notes
"Whataya Want from Me" was only performed in Cologne, Landgraaf, Heilbronn, Stadtallendorf, Munich, Berlin, and Ipswich.
In Landgraaf, Pink performed Tom Petty's "Free Fallin'", in place of "Roxanne".
Pink covered 4 Non Blondes' "What's Up" on select dates.
Starting on June 2, "I Don't Believe You" and "Dear Mr. President" were added to the set list.
During the concerts in Glasgow and Ipswich, "Just Like a Pill" and "Bad Influence" swapped places.
In Arras, "Bad Influence", "Please Don't Leave Me", "Unwind", and "U + Ur Hand" were not performed.

Tour dates

Notes

References

External links
 
 

2010 concert tours
Pink (singer) concert tours
Concert tours of Europe
Concert tours of France
Concert tours of Germany
Concert tours of Ireland
Concert tours of the United Kingdom